William David Fulton (born October 22, 1963) is a former pitcher in Major League Baseball. He played for the New York Yankees for three total games during the 1987 season. He had a career 11.57 earned run average in 4.2 innings pitched. Fulton played collegiately at Pensacola Junior College.

References

External links

1963 births
Living people
Baseball players from Pittsburgh
Major League Baseball pitchers
New York Yankees players
Pensacola State Pirates baseball players
Albany-Colonie Yankees players
Columbus Clippers players
Fort Lauderdale Yankees players
Greensboro Hornets players
Oneonta Yankees players